Scarz (stylized as SCARZ) is a Japanese esports organization that was founded in 2012. It has players competing in the domestic and international scenes as a representative of Japan's esports community.

History 
The organization was founded in February 2012 as an amateur team competing in the Battlefield 3 pro scene. It then became a professional esports organization in 2015. The name SCARZ was derived from scars, as the organization was "founded with the intention of leaving an impression on people's hearts". The organization also has a mentorship program to train Japanese emerging pro players. On 13 April 2018, the organization began a partnership with Japanese football club FC Tokyo.

Current rosters

Apex Legends – Europe

Call of Duty

Tom Clancy's Rainbow Six Siege

Former rosters

Counter-Strike: Global Offensive

References

External links 
 

2012 establishments in Japan
Esports teams based in Japan
Esports teams established in 2012
Call of Duty teams
Counter-Strike teams
Fighting game player sponsors
Former League of Legends Japan League teams
Tom Clancy's Rainbow Six Siege teams